This is a list of Punjabi films of 1981.

List of films

References

1981
Punjabi